Schalk Burger Geldenhuys (born on 18 May 1956) is a South African former rugby union player.

Career
Throughout his career he played for only province, Northern Transvaal. Geldenhuys played 184 matches for Northern Transvaal and also captained his province 54 times.

In total, he played in seven tests for the Springboks and scored one try. His first test was as flanker on 29 August 1981 against the All Blacks at Athletic Park, Wellington.  His seventh and final test occurred on 2 September 1989 against a World XV side at Ellis Park, Johannesburg.

Test history

Accolades
He was inducted into the University of Pretoria sport hall of fame.

See also
List of South Africa national rugby union players – Springbok no. 528

References

1956 births
Living people
People from Kroonstad
South African rugby union players
South Africa international rugby union players
University of Pretoria alumni
Blue Bulls players
Rugby union players from the Free State (province)
Rugby union flankers